Justice Adams may refer to:

Annette Abbott Adams (1877–1956), American judge who served by special assignment on one case in the California Supreme Court
Alto L. Adams (1899–1988), justice for the Florida Supreme Court
Austin Adams (lawyer) (1826–1890), justice of the Iowa Supreme Court
Andrew Adams (politician) (1736–1797), chief justice of the Connecticut Supreme Court
Charles Bayley Adams (1887–1961), justice of the Vermont Supreme Court
Clark J. Adams (1904–1981), justice of the Michigan Supreme Court
Natalie Adams (born 1965), justice of the Supreme Court of New South Wales
Oscar Adams (1925–1997), associate justice of the Supreme Court of Alabama
Paul L. Adams (Michigan judge) (1908–1990), justice of the Michigan Supreme Court
Rowland K. Adams (1889–1944), justice of the Maryland Court of Appeals
Samuel B. Adams (1853–1938), justice of the Supreme Court of Georgia
Washington Adams (1814–1883), justice of the Supreme Court of Missouri

See also
Judge Adams (disambiguation)